James Dozier may refer to:
 James B. Dozier (1820–1901), scout during the Indian Wars and civilian Medal of Honor recipient
 James C. Dozier (1885–1974), United States Army general and Medal of Honor recipient
 James L. Dozier (born 1931), United States Army general